Anamorphosis or Anamorphogenesis refers to postembryonic development and moulting in Arthropoda that results in the addition of abdominal body segments, even after sexual maturity. Examples of this mode of development occur in proturans and millipedes.

Protura hatch with only 8 abdominal segments and add the remaining 3 in subsequent moults. These new segments arise behind the last abdominal segment, but in front of the telson.

In myriapods, euanamorphosis is when the addition of new segments continues during each moult, without there being a fixed number of segments for the adult, teloanamorphosis is when the moulting ceases once the adult has reached a fixed number of segments, and hemianamorphosis is when a fixed number of segments is reached, after which moulting continues with segments only growing in size, not number.

References

Developmental biology
Arthropod morphology